Chakeri is a census town in Kanpur metropolitan area, situated about 16 kilometres east of Kanpur city in the state of Uttar Pradesh, India. It is an industrial town with textiles and food products as its major productions. Chakeri Airforce Station, North India's second largest Airforce base is situated here. Chakeri also has reputed educational institutions and colleges. Central Leather Research Institute, the only government leather research institute in North India is situated here. Grand Trunk Road made by the great emperor Sher Shah Suri passes from Chakeri. The town is enlisted as a Town Area of Kanpur metropolitan area.

Demographics

Chakeri has population of 7,526 of which 3,803 are males while 3,723 are females as per report released by Census India 2011. Population of Children with age of 0-6 is 1116 which is 14.83% of total population of Chakeri (CT). In Chakeri Census Town, Female Sex Ratio is of 979 against state average of 912. Moreover, Child Sex Ratio in Chakeri is around 996 compared to Uttar Pradesh state average of 902. Literacy rate of Chakeri city is 89.63% higher than state average of 67.68%. In Chakeri, Male literacy is around 93.74% while female literacy rate is 85.41%. Chakeri Census Town has total administration over 2,109 houses to which it supplies basic amenities like water and sewerage. It is also authorized to build roads within Census Town limits and impose taxes on properties coming under its jurisdiction.

History
Chakeri is a suburb to Jajmau (Ruled by King Yayati) on the banks of river Ganges. Founder of this place was Gangadeen Yadav. He built wells, temple and restroom for passengers in the memory of his mother Ramadevi. Now it is one of the famous landmark in Kanpur. An artificial pond made by emperor Sher Shah Suri is also present here which attracts large numbers of tourists. Siddhnath Temple and Ghat on the banks of Ganges are also major tourist destinations in Chakeri. Chakeri Air Force Station which was established in the 1970s is the second largest Air Force Base in India.

Education

Chakeri is an educational hub in East Kanpur. Many private and government colleges and institutes are present here. Kanpur Institute of Technology, Vision Group of Colleges, Allenhouse Group of Colleges, Apollo Institutes, Axis college, Central Leather Research Institute and Ratan Industrial Training Institute are major educational institutions in Chakeri.

Roads
The important highways which pass through Chakeri are:-

National Highway 2

The NHAI proposes to upgrade a road project in Uttar Pradesh.
The Authority intends to take up six-laning of the Etawah-Ramadevi chowk (Kanpur) section of NH-2 from Km
323.475 to Km 483.687 under NHDP Phase V. The project is expected to cost Rs 1,698.50 crore.
RFQs have been invited from prospective entities, with last date of submission being 10 December 2010.

National Highway 25

Transport

Airways

Kanpur Airport is situated in Chakeri which has flights to Delhi, Mumbai and Ahmedabad. The airport is expected to be connected with other major cities of India, Middle East and the Orient by 2020.

Railways

Chakeri Railway Station is on the Delhi-Howrah line. Kanpur Central Railway Station is 12 km away from Chakeri. Public transport is easily available throughout 24 hrs from Chakeri Railway Station Bus Stop situated 750 metres from the station on NH 2.

Roadways

Chakeri has KMBS terminal and City Buses of Kanpur have routes from different bus stops of Chakeri to different localities and suburban towns of Kanpur metropolitan area. One can catch interstate buses from Ramadevi at a regular frequency. Multinational cab companies like Ola and Uber have their services in the town.

People

Some famous personalities from Chakeri are:-
Sriprakash Jaiswal (former Union Coal Minister under UPA government) 
Satish Mahana (politician)
Ghazala Lari (politician)
Kritika Kamra (actress, alumni of St Joseph's School)
Poonam Dhillon (alumni of Air Force School)
Kuldeep Yadav (cricketer)

Sister cities

References

Cities and towns in Kanpur Nagar district